Richard Ernsberger Jr. is a journalist and author of non-fiction.

Education
Ernsberger received his undergraduate degree from the University of Tennessee and master's degree in journalism from Columbia University.

Career
He spent 20 years as a writer, correspondent, and senior editor at Newsweek.  Ernsberger was also a former editor of Virginia Living Magazine.

Selected works
Lynch, Allen J., and Richard Ernsberger. Zero to Hero: From Bullied Kid to Warrior.  Chicago: Pritzker Military Museum & Library, 2019. 
Kershaw, Alex, Richard Ernsberger, and Jennifer N. Pritzker. The General: William Levine, Citizen Soldier and Liberator. Chicago: Pritzker Military Museum & Library, 2016.  
Calhoun, Jim, and Richard Ernsberger. A Passion to Lead: Seven Leadership Secrets for Success in Business, Sports, and Life. New York: St. Martin's Griffin, 2008. 
Ernsberger, Richard. God, Pepsi, and Groovin' on the High Side: Tales from the NASCAR Circuit. New York: M. Evans and Co, 2003. 
Ernsberger, Richard. Bragging Rights: A Season Inside the SEC, Football's Toughest Conference. New York: M. Evans and Co, 2000.

Personal life
Ernsberger is married and has a daughter.

References

American male journalists
University of Tennessee alumni
Columbia University Graduate School of Journalism alumni
Year of birth missing (living people)
Living people